Ruben Bemelmans was the defending champion from the last edition of the tournament in 2009. He successfully defended his title, defeating Dominik Meffert 6–7(8–10), 6–4, 6–4 in the final.

Seeds

Draw

Finals

Top half

Bottom half

References
 Main Draw
 Qualifying Draw

Volkswagen Challenger - Singles
2011 Singles